A referendum on the October Paper was held in Egypt on 15 May 1974. It was approved by 99.9% of voters, with a turnout of 97.9%.

Results

References

Egypt
1974 in Egypt
Referendums in Egypt
May 1974 events in Africa